Northwest sound may refer to:
 Northwest Sound Men's Chorus, American a cappella group
 Northwest sound (movement), Indie rock movement including Built to Spill